Enver Kemal Yetiker (1875 Kadıköy, Istanbul – 1955, Istanbul) was a Turkish educator at Saint Joseph's College. He was among the founding line-up of the Turkish football club Fenerbahçe.

References

1875 births
1955 deaths
Schoolteachers from Istanbul
Turkish sports businesspeople
Burials at Zincirlikuyu Cemetery